Trox aequalis is a beetle of the family Trogidae. It is found in North America (northern Mexico, United States, Canada).

References

aequalis
Beetles of North America
Taxa named by Thomas Say
Beetles described in 1831